The greater long-tailed bat (Choeroniscus periosus) is a species of bat in the family Phyllostomidae. It is found in Colombia and Ecuador.

References

Choeroniscus
Mammals of Colombia
Mammals of Ecuador
Mammals described in 1966
Taxonomy articles created by Polbot
Bats of South America